Krystyna Ostromęcka-Guryn (born 12 March 1948) is a former Polish volleyball player, a member of Poland women's national volleyball team in 1968–1974, a bronze medalist of the Olympic Games Mexico 1968 and European Championship 1974).

External links
 
 

1948 births
Living people
Olympic volleyball players of Poland
Volleyball players at the 1968 Summer Olympics
Olympic bronze medalists for Poland
Sportspeople from Bydgoszcz
Polish women's volleyball players
Olympic medalists in volleyball
Medalists at the 1968 Summer Olympics